Academy of Sciences of the Republic of Tajikistan incorporates 20 research institutes and three territorial groupings: the Pamir Branch in the eastern part of the country (with 2 institutes), the Khujand Scientific Center in the north, and the Khatlon Scientific Center in the south-west. The Academy is organized in three thematic divisions: physico-mathematical, chemical, and geological sciences; biological and medical sciences; humanities and social sciences. The incumbent president is Academician M.I. Ilolov, elected in 2005.

Originally a part of the Soviet Academy of Sciences, the Tajik Academy of Sciences was established in 1951 as the Academy of Sciences of Tajik SSR, designated the highest scientific body in Tajik SSR and since 1991 in the Republic of Tajikistan.

Notes

External links

 Official website 
 Academy of Sciences of Tajik SSR in Big Soviet Encyclopedia, online edition 
 H. Borjian, Tajikistan Academy of Sciences, Encyclopaedia Iranica Online

 
National academies of sciences
National academies of arts and humanities
Science and technology in Tajikistan
1951 establishments in the Soviet Union
Scientific organizations established in 1951
Members of the International Council for Science
USSR Academy of Sciences
Members of the International Science Council